Forest Lake Academy is a private high school outside Orlando, Florida. It is owned and operated by the Florida Conference of Seventh-day Adventists. It is a part of the Seventh-day Adventist education system, the world's second-largest Christian school system.

History

The Lake Winyah School
The first academy established by the Florida Conference of Seventh-day Adventists was Lake Winyah Academy  in 1918  in Orlando, Florida. In March, 1918, the Florida Conference Committee and the Sanitarium Board met. William H. Branson, L. H. Wood, J. A. Tucker, and W. E. Abernathy were present. They planned for the opening of the school. This included the construction of two buildings: a main building and a dormitory. Both these buildings were to be built as economically as possible; later on more permanent structures could be built. The conference and sanitarium leadership served on the board of the school. They planned to open in fall 1918.  This first school was to be located between Winyah and Estelle Lakes. Adventist University of Health Sciences (formerly Florida Hospital College of Health Sciences) is located there now.

Forest Lake Academy
The growing school moved outside the city to its current location in 1926 and was renamed Forest Lake Academy.
The first classes were held in the farm house of the newly acquired  site.

Location
The campus is located in unincorporated Seminole County, Florida between Apopka and Altamonte Springs. Because of ZIP code assignments, the school is usually referred to as being in Apopka, although it is in a different county.

Academic programs
Forest Lake Academy was accredited by the Southern Association of Colleges and Schools (SACS) from 1948 to 2011, and is now accredited by Middle States Association of Colleges and Schools. In addition to offering a general diploma and a college preparatory diploma, Forest Lake has an honors program with various concentration tracks including mathematics, humanities, and science. It offers several dual enrollment courses to students with high academic standing.

Curriculum
The school's curriculum consists primarily of the standard courses taught at college preparatory schools across the world. All students are required to take classes in the core areas of English, basic sciences, mathematics, social sciences, and a foreign language. In addition, religion classes are mandated on a yearly basis.

Spiritual aspect
All students are required to take religion classes each year that they are enrolled. These classes cover topics in biblical history and Christian and denominational doctrines.. Instructors in other disciplines also begin each class period with prayer or a short devotional thought. Weekly, the entire student body gathers together in the auditorium for an hour-long chapel service. Outside the classrooms there is year-round spiritually oriented programming that relies on student involvement.

See also

 List of Seventh-day Adventist secondary schools
 Seventh-day Adventist education

References

External links

High schools in Orange County, Florida
Private high schools in Florida
Educational institutions established in 1918
1918 establishments in Florida
Adventist secondary schools in the United States